Joel Greenberg may refer to:

 Joel Greenberg (historian) (born 1946), English educational technology consultant and historian
 Joel Greenberg (politician) (born 1984), American politician and former Florida tax collector; associate of Matt Gaetz
 Joel Greenberg (naturalist), author of A Feathered River Across the Sky: The Passenger Pigeon's Flight to Extinction and A Natural History of the Chicago Region